Yevgeni Aleksandrovich Ragoza (born 11 January 1979) is a Russian professional football coach and a former player. He is an assistant coach with FC Strogino Moscow.

Club career
He played three seasons in the Russian Football National League for FC Sokol Saratov, FC Metallurg-Kuzbass Novokuznetsk and FC Sodovik Sterlitamak.

Honours
 Russian Second Division top scorer: 2004 (Zone Ural/Povolzhye, 21 goals), 2007 (Zone East, 19 goals).

References

External links
 

1979 births
Living people
Russian footballers
Association football forwards
FC Sibir Novosibirsk players
FC Sokol Saratov players
FC Dynamo Barnaul players
FC Volga Nizhny Novgorod players
FC Sodovik Sterlitamak players
FC Zvezda Irkutsk players
FC Irtysh Omsk players
FC Novokuznetsk players